Sadjad University is one of the most reputable universities in Mashhad, Iran. Founded in 1995 in Mashhad, it has always ranked first among the non-governmental universities of the country in the rankings released by the Ministry of Science. It is also the first university in Iran originating from an industrial research center which still functions as the university's research core.

Sadjad University started its educational activity as a higher education institution. In 2014, it was promoted to an industrial university, and seven years later, in 2020, it turned into a general university offering non-engineering majors as well, including industrial management, sport sciences, English teaching, and law. 

Its 16000 alumni are mostly either pursuing their education at higher levels in other prestigious universities or working in a career related to their field of study. The outstanding success of this university can be observed not only in the great number of its students passing the national master's exam (more than 4000 students in the recent years), but also in the strong presence of its graduates in different sections of industry. Based on the latest surveys conducted by the Universities-Industry Collaboration Office, more than 70% of its alumni have entered the job market in a course of two years. 
Sadjad University has five faculties: Electrical and Medical Engineering, Computer and Information Technology, Civil Engineering, Architecture, and Urbanism, Industrial and Mechanical Engineering, and Humanities. Currently, 5000 students are studying at this university at different levels of PhD (2 programs), master's (21 programs), bachelor’s (14 programs), non-continuous bachelor’s (4 programs), and associate’s (1 program).

Ranking

Based on the ministry of science published ranking in 2015, Sadjad University is a first grade non-governmental non-profit university, which means it has the support of the ministry of science and has no limits for development. Also, based on an unofficial ranking in 2009, Sadjad University is among the top 5 non-governmental non-profit universities, holding the first rank among industrial universities.

Faculties:

•	Electrical and Medical Engineering 

•	Industrial and Mechanical Engineering 

•	Computer and Information Technology 

•	Civil Engineering, Architecture, and Urbanism 

•	Humanities 

Educational Facilities

Sadjad University hosts its research and academic activities on an area of 10811 square meters with a foundation of 14000 square meters. Its educational and research facilities include: Seminar and educational classes, library and study halls, computer site, research center, robotics and project hall, 17 laboratories and workshops of computer engineering department, 25 laboratories and workshops of industrial engineering and electrical engineering departments, auditorium with lobby, dining hall, physical education center, etc.

Sadjad Electronic Knowledge Enterprise

This knowledge enterprise has more than 30 years of experience in engaging in such activities as engineering, offering counselling services to different urban and industrial centers, and designing and producing electrical gadgets, and developing and selling technical knowledge. In recent years and relying on native technical capability, this enterprise has offered a range of products in the field of automatic vehicle locator (AVL). Also, it has offered and commercialized a number of knowledge-based products including: 

1.	Solar power plant monitoring system (SAMANIR) 

2.	Intelligent door control system 

3.	Smart monitoring of road traffic fleet system (SEPAHTAN)

4.	Smart integral system of control and monitoring of urban transportation fleet (SEPAD)

5.	Mass production of the new product of Sadjad vehicle locator (RadyabS)

Open Learning Center

Sadjad Open Learning Center was founded in 2017, with the vision of skill development and empowerment of higher education students and alumni. This center aims for meeting the needs of service and industry vocations to develop new and practical skills, holding short-term demand-driven training courses, competing with other centers in terms of number of trainees and quality of courses, raising students’ motivation and self-regard, and empowering the students. 

This center offers a variety of specialized and practical short-term courses and intramural courses for executive and other organizations. It has so far held over 500 courses for trainees from all over the country with the most competent national and international teachers. Moreover, this center has worked in close collaboration with such organizations as municipality, governor’s office, engineering organization, ministry of roads and urban development, industrial parks, etc. It has also held conferences with over 1500 participants.

Office of Collaboration with Industry

Sadjad University’s office of collaboration with Industry started its activities in 2003 under the supervision of the university’s deputy of research. This office aims to establish sensible and enduring contact between the potentials of the university and different industrial and service needs of the society and also to promote scientific and technological achievements of the university. Through cooperation with other sections of Deputy of Research and Sadjad Research Center, its current activities focus on the three domains of internship, demand-driven theses, and applied theses.

ACM Competitions

Enjoying the support of the faculty members, Sadjad university’s ACM competition and programming group has always encouraged increased participation in these competitions with the aim of motivating students to promote their scientific competence. The university has high prospects for holding its programming competitions as one of the official preparation contests for Tehran’s main competitions. With its talented and keen students, experienced faculty members, and supporting administrative staff, Sadjad University currently has the honor of hosting corresponding active teams from other universities of the country.

Students’ Scientific Association

Students’ Scientific Association aims at establishing students’ contact with industry and developing their individual and teamwork skills so as to train them during their academic education to be efficient people for the society. The Association activities include offering training courses and industrial visits and preparing students to enter the job market. For further information on the events join this channel: t. me/sadjad_society

Baran Student Society

Baran Student Society was founded in 2003 in Sadjad University, with the aim of providing the opportunity for the students to keep in touch with the abandoned and poorly cared-for children, adolescents, and youth of the Welfare Organization. This society seeks to raise social insight and responsibility as well as to offer financial and other help and contributions of the academic society to the target communities.

References

Universities in Iran
Buildings and structures in Mashhad
Education in Razavi Khorasan Province